Granville Earl Anderson  (born ) is a Canadian politician in Ontario, Canada. He was a Liberal member of the Legislative Assembly of Ontario from 2014 to 2018 who represented the riding of Durham. Anderson served as Regional Councillor for Wards 3 & 4 on the municipal council in Clarington, from 2018 to 2022. He is currently Regional Councillor for Wards 1 & 2 of Clarington.

Background
Anderson was born in Jamaica and moved to Canada with his family when he was 13. He attended the University of Windsor where he obtained a certificate in mediation law, and earned a business administration diploma through Seneca College. He was elected as a separate school trustee in 2003, and was eventually elected as the chair of Peterborough, Victoria, Northumberland, and Clarington Catholic District School Board. He owns his own company specializing in mediation services.

Politics
He ran in the 2014 provincial election as the Liberal candidate in the riding of Durham. He defeated Progressive Conservative candidate Mike Patrick by 1,236 votes.

He served as Parliamentary Assistant to the Minister of Children and Youth Services and as the Parliamentary Assistant to the Minister of Education (Ontario).

Anderson was defeated in the 2018 Ontario general election.

In 2018, Anderson ran for election in the Municipality of Clarington as Regional Councillor for Wards 3 & 4, winning with 34.11% of the vote.

Anderson ran as the Ontario Liberal Party candidate for the riding of Durham in the 2022 Ontario general election, but lost to Progressive Conservative Todd McCarthy.

In 2022, Anderson ran for election in the Municipality of Clarington as Regional Councillor for Wards 1 & 2, winning in a close race with 44.2% of the vote.

Electoral record

Provincial

Municipal

References

External links

1960s births
21st-century Canadian politicians
Black Canadian politicians
Jamaican emigrants to Canada
Living people
Ontario Liberal Party MPPs
Ontario school board trustees
Seneca College alumni
University of Windsor alumni
York University alumni